Trachylepis tandrefana is a species of skink, a lizard in the family Scincidae.

The species is endemic to Madagascar.

References

Trachylepis
Reptiles of Madagascar
Endemic fauna of Madagascar
Reptiles described in 1999
Taxa named by Ronald Archie Nussbaum
Taxa named by Christopher John Raxworthy
Taxa named by Jean-Baptiste Ramanamanjato